Broken English is a name for a non-standard, non-traditionally spoken or alternatively-written version of the English language. These forms of English are sometimes considered as a pidgin if they have derived in a context where more than one language is used. Under the most commonly accepted definition of the term, broken English consists of English vocabulary grafted onto the syntax of a non-English speaker's native language, including word order, other aspects of sentence structure, and the presence or absence of articles in the speaker's native language. Typically, the non-English speaker also strips English phrases of linguistic markings that are definite articles or certain verb tenses.

In some communities, young people may intentionally adopt versions of the English language that older people consider to be broken English. This has been documented, for example, among the Māori of New Zealand, where the younger generation was more proficient in English than the previous generation, but intentionally made modifications to the language to assert their own sense of cultural identity. 

Nigeria is one of the major countries in Africa known for an international version of pidgin or broken English widely accepted and spoken across West Africa and other continents, especially the whole of Southern and some part of Western Nigeria have a large number of people who have over time adopted it as a sense of common language and unified second cultural identity.

Broken English in Literature 
In literature, broken English is often used to depict the foreignness of a character, or that character's lack of intelligence or education. However, poets have also intentionally used broken English to create a desired artistic impression, or as a creative experiment writing somewhere between standard English and a local language or dialect.

For example, in Henry V, William Shakespeare used broken English to convey the national pride of Scottish and Irish allies in the King's invasion of Normandy. When Henry himself last implores the French Princess Katherine to marry him, knowing that her command of the English language is limited, he says to her: "Come, your answer in broken music; for thy voice is music and thy English broken; therefore, queen of all, Katherine, break thy mind to me in broken English."

See also

Creole language
Interlanguage
All your base are belong to us
Chinglish
Doge
Engrish
List of English-based pidgins
Non-native pronunciations of English
Singlish
Polandball

References

English language